Christina Vidal is an American actress and singer. She is best known for her roles in films such as Life with Mikey, Brink!, Freaky Friday, See No Evil and for her role in Nickelodeon sitcom Taina, in which she played the title character (2001–2002), as Gina Perrello in Code Black (2015–2016), and as Detective Valeria Chavez in Training Day (2017).

Early life and education 
Vidal was born and raised in Whitestone, an area in Queens, New York City, the daughter of Manny Vidal, a tax consultant and businessman, and his wife Josie, a secretary, both of Puerto Rican ancestry. She attended the Fiorello H. LaGuardia High School. When she was 17 in 1998, she joined a girl group called Gemstone (along with Jade Villalon and Crystal Grant). Vidal later moved to Orlando, Florida, to proceed with the filming of Taina. Her sisters Lisa and Tanya are also actresses and have appeared on TV and in theatre; she also has a brother, Christian.

Career

Acting 
Vidal's acting career began when one of her teachers told her there was an audition for the film Life with Mikey (1993), starring Canadian actor Michael J. Fox. She auditioned and got the part of "Angie Vega", becoming the first Puerto Rican child actress to play a lead in an US film. Since then, Vidal has appeared in feature films and television series. She portrayed Taina Maria Morales in the Nickelodeon sitcom Taina in 2001 and 2002. The series ran for two seasons with speculation that it would be renewed for more; however, increasing production and music costs caused its cancellation during the summer period of 2002. 

The next year she played Maddie in the film Freaky Friday alongside Lindsay Lohan and starred in the short-lived ABC action TV series about police officers called 10-8: Officers on Duty until she suddenly left after two months on the show. Also in 2003 she guest-starred in Sabrina, the Teenage Witch as Paris Fate. In 2006 she did an untitled sitcom pilot with her sisters for ABC (which was executively produced by George Lopez). The show was not picked up, but later that year she starred in the film See No Evil and also had a brief stint on the hit sitcom Girlfriends. More recently she has made cameo appearances in the films I Think I Love My Wife, Mask of the Ninja, and the Internet comedy short "Love Automatically", written by Mylinda Royer and directed by Allison Haislip. Most recently, Vidal played a supporting character in the film Magic Man, which was released in 2009.

Music 
When Vidal was in the band Gemstone, she recorded songs with herself as well as bandmate Jade Villalon performing vocals. A few of these tracks would surface many years later on albums consisting of demos, rare tracks, and special songs of Villalon's music project, Sweetbox. In 2002, she was briefly signed to MCA Records and in that time she was supposed to release her first single "Tropical" and her solo debut album White in the summer of 2002, but never did. That same year she provided guest vocals on the remix of Will Smith's summer hit "Black Suits Comin' (Nod Ya Head)" from the Men in Black II soundtrack. She was a part of Lupe Fiasco's 1st & 15th Entertainment. She also recorded a track for the work out cd called Byou from Sabrina Bryan of The Cheetah Girls. The song she recorded was "Anything Is Possible". She also sang the song "Take Me Away" in the film Freaky Friday.

Filmography

Discography

Soundtracks 
2002: Taina soundtrack
2003: Chasing Papi soundtrack
2003: Freaky Friday soundtrack
2006: Byou soundtrack

Awards and nominations

See also 

List of Puerto Ricans

References

External links 

 Christina Vidal on Instagram
 Christina Vidal on Twitter

1981 births
Actresses from New York City
American child actresses
American film actresses
American people of Puerto Rican descent
Hispanic and Latino American actresses
American television actresses
Living people
People from Whitestone, Queens
Singers from New York City
20th-century American actresses
21st-century American singers
21st-century American actresses